The Campeonato Paranaense Série Prata is the second tier of football league of the state of Paraná, Brazil.

List of champions

Notes
 In 1971 Britânia, Ferroviário and Palestra Itália merged into the Colorado Esporte Clube.
 In 1971 Água Verde and Savóia merged into the Esporte Clube Pinheiros.
 In 1989 Colorado and Pinheiros merged into the Paraná Clube.
 Maringá FC, winners of 1995 edition and Maringá FC, winners of 2017 edition are two different clubs. 

Names change
Malutron (Malucelli/Tronbini) changed its name to J. Malucelli after the end of the partnership.
Serrano is the currently Prudentópolis.
Metropolitano is the currently Maringá FC.

Titles by team 

Teams in bold still active.

By city

References

 
Paranaense